Umbra Vitae is an American death metal supergroup formed in 2020. The band features vocalist Jacob Bannon (Converge), guitarists Mike McKenzie (The Red Chord) and Sean Martin (Twitching Tongues, Hatebreed), bassist Greg Weeks (The Red Chord) and drummer Jon Rice (Uncle Acid & the Deadbeats, Job for a Cowboy). The band's debut album, Shadow of Life, was released in 2020.

History
Umbra Vitae was formed by Jacob Bannon, Mike McKenzie and Sean Martin during the rehearsal sessions for Bannon's solo project, Wear Your Wounds. During the album cycle for Wear Your Wounds, bassist Greg Weeks and drummer Jon Rice joined the line-up. The band takes its name from the 1912 poem of the same name by Georg Heym.

In March 2020, the band announced its debut album, Shadow of Life and issued the lead single, "Return to Zero". The record was produced by Converge guitarist Kurt Ballou. In April 2020, the music video for the track "Mantra of Madness" was released. In June 2020, the band released the second music video, "Ethereal Emptiness".

Musical style
Umbra Vitae has been described as a death metal band. On the band's sound, Bannon has stated: "This is the closest thing I've done that's rooted in more traditional death metal, at least in terms of speed and ferocity and heaviness." According to Jamie Ludwig of Chicago Reader, the band's debut album "mixes 90s and modern influences with hardcore energy and plenty of grit, anxiety, and rage."

Members
Jacob Bannon — vocals (2020—present)
Mike McKenzie — guitar (2020—present)
Sean Martin — guitar (2020—present)
Greg Weeks — bass (2020—present)
Jon Rice — drums (2020—present)

Discography
Studio albums
 Shadow of Life (2020)

Singles
 "Return to Zero" (2020)
 "Mantra of Madness" (2020)

Music videos
 "Mantra of Madness" (2020)
 "Ethereal Emptiness" (2020)

References

External links

Musical groups established in 2020
American death metal musical groups
Deathwish Inc. artists
Musical quintets
Heavy metal supergroups
American supergroups